Preconditioning is a concept in numerical linear algebra.

Preconditioning may also refer to:

 Preconditioning (adaptation), a general concept in which an entity is exposed to a form of some stress or stimulus in order to prepare that entity to be more resilient against the stimulus when and if the stimulus is encountered in the future.
 Ischemic preconditioning, an experimental technique for producing resistance to the loss of blood supply to tissues of many types
 Sensory preconditioning, a phenomenon of classical conditioning that demonstrates learning of an association between two conditioned stimuli
 Conditioning in stem cell transplantation before the stem cell transfer.

See also

 Precondition